Fredrik Persson (born 20 February 1983) is a Swedish former footballer who played as a goalkeeper.

References

External links
 

1983 births
Living people
Association football goalkeepers
Trelleborgs FF players
Kongsvinger IL Toppfotball players
Allsvenskan players
Superettan players
Norwegian First Division players
Expatriate footballers in Norway
Swedish expatriate footballers
Swedish expatriate sportspeople in Norway
Swedish footballers